Anomalacra is a genus of shining leaf chafers in the family Scarabaeidae, containing one described species, Anomalacra clypealis.

References

Further reading

 
 
 
 

Rutelinae
Monotypic Scarabaeidae genera
Articles created by Qbugbot